Aleksandar Vukic (born 6 April 1996) is an Australian professional tennis player.

Vukic has a career high ATP singles ranking of World No. 117 achieved on 28 February 2022. He also has a career high ATP doubles ranking of World No. 394 achieved on the same date. Vukic has won one ITF Futures singles title. Vukic made his main draw ATP singles debut at the 2018 Sydney International and his Grand Slam debut at the 2020 French Open, after qualifying for both.

Early life
Vukic was born in Sydney, Australia. His parents and older brother left Montenegro during the breakup of Yugoslavia in the early 1990s and settled in Sydney before Vukic was born. Vukic began playing tennis at the age of 6 and later attended the University of Illinois between 2015 and 2018 where he was named three-time All-American in tennis.

Professional career

2014–2019: ITF and ATP debut
Vukic made his ITF Tour debut in Spain in May 2014.

Vukic made his main draw ATP singles debut at the 2018 Sydney International, where he qualified for the main draw by defeating Dušan Lajović and Ričardas Berankis. He came within two points of defeating Feliciano Lopez, ranked 36 in the world. He lost the match 6–4, 6–7(5–7), 3–6.

In May 2019, Vukic reached the semi-final of the 2019 Savannah Challenger, his best performance at the ATP Challenger Tour level. Following a quarter-final appearance at 2019 Internazionali di Tennis Città dell'Aquila, Vukic reached a career high singles ranking of 258.

2020: Grand Slam and top 200 debut
In January 2020, Vukic reached the final round of 2020 Australian Open – Men's singles qualifying. In March 2020, Vukic reached his first ATP Challenger Tour final in Monterrey Challenger. 

In September, Vukic qualified for the 2020 French Open main draw, where he made his Grand Slam singles debut. He lost in round one to Pedro Martínez.

Vukic ended 2020 with a singles ranking of World No. 196.

2021: First ATP Tour win, Masters debut & first win
Vukic commenced the 2021 season at the 2021 Great Ocean Road Open, where he defeated Yen-Hsun Lu for his first ATP main draw win. Vukic was defeated by Jannik Sinner in the second round.

At the 2021 Australian Open, Vukic entered into the main draw as a wildcard and lost to 19th seed Karen Khachanov in the first round.

Vukic returned the ATP Challenger tour, achieving quarterfinal appearances in April at Split and Split II.

Vukic lost in the third and final round of qualifying for the French Open and in the first round of qualifying for Wimbledon Championships.

In August 2021, Vukic tested positive for COVID-19 and had to skip the US Open.

On 20 September 2021, and following a semifinal result at the Cary Challenger, Vukic improved his ranking back to No. 214. 

At the 2021 BNP Paribas Open he recorded his first main draw win at a Masters 1000 level as a qualifier defeating Pablo Andujar. He followed this by a final also in singles at the 2021 Charlottesville Men's Pro Challenger where he lost to Stefan Kozlov. He reached a career-high singles ranking of No. 156 on 22 November 2021.

2022: First ATP quarterfinal & Major win, top 125
At the Adelaide International 2, Vukic achieved his first top 50 win against Alexander Bublik and reached his first ATP Tour-level quarterfinal, before losing to Thanasi Kokkinakis. As a result, he made his top 150 debut at World No. 144 on 17 January 2022.

Vukic was awarded a second wildcard into the 2022 Australian Open. He defeated 30th seed Lloyd Harris in four sets for his first Grand Slam victory. He lost to qualifier Radu Albot in the second round.

At the 2022 Sofia Open he defeated Fabio Fognini and Fernando Verdasco to reach only his second ATP quarterfinal.

2023
He qualified into his second Masters 1000 main draw in Indian Wells for a second time at this tournament.

ATP Challenger and ITF Futures/World Tennis Tour finals

Singles: 11 (2–9)

Doubles: 2 (0–2)

Performance timelines

Singles
Current through the 2023 Australian Open.

References

External links
 
 
 Aleksandar Vukic at Illinois Fighting Illini
 

1996 births
Living people
Australian male tennis players
Tennis players from Sydney
Illinois Fighting Illini men's tennis players
Australian people of Montenegrin descent